Fangs of Destiny is a 1927 American silent Western film directed by Stuart Paton and written by George Morgan and Gardner Bradford. The film stars Dynamite the Dog, Edmund Cobb, Betty Caldwell, George Periolat, Carl Sepulveda and Al Ferguson. The film was released on December 4, 1927, by Universal Pictures.

Cast    
 Dynamite the Dog as Dynamite 
 Edmund Cobb as Jerry Matthews
 Betty Caldwell as Rose Shelby
 George Periolat as Colonel Shelby
 Carl Sepulveda as Hank Mitchell
 Al Ferguson as Thomas Shields
 Joan Hathaway as Sally Ann 
 Brick Cannon as Sheriff Canby

References

External links
 

1927 films
1927 Western (genre) films
Universal Pictures films
Films directed by Stuart Paton
American black-and-white films
Silent American Western (genre) films
1920s English-language films
1920s American films